The ECCW Championship (formerly known as the NWA/ECCW  Heavyweight Championship) is the top singles championship in Elite Canadian Championship Wrestling. It was first established in 1996 in the then-independent ECCW, and its name was changed when ECCW joined the National Wrestling Alliance in 1998.

Title history

Combined reigns

See also
Elite Canadian Championship Wrestling
National Wrestling Alliance

References

External links
NWA/ECCW Pacific Northwest Heavyweight title history at Wrestling-Titles.com
NWA/ECCW Championship history at ECCW website
 ECCW Championship

National Wrestling Alliance championships
Regional professional wrestling championships
Heavyweight wrestling championships
Elite Canadian Championship Wrestling championships